Coffee Break! was the last album by Human Switchboard. It was recorded live at the Agora Ballroom in Cleveland on November 8, 1981 and was broadcast on radio station WMMS. It was issued on both cassette tape and LP.

Track listing
All songs written by Bob Pfeifer, except where noted.

Side one

"Who's Landing in My Hangar?" 
"I Can Walk Alone" – (Bob Pfeifer / Myrna Marcarian)
"Sharpest Girl"
"In This Town"
"Why Why"
"No Heart"

Side two
"Maybe (Somebody Wanted to Help)"
"It's Not Fair"
"She Invites"
"Where the Light Breaks"
"Book on Looks"

Personnel
Robert “Bob” Pfeifer  -  vocals, guitar
Myrna Marcarian  - Farfisa organ, vocals
Ron Metz - drums
Steve Calabaria - bass

References

Coffee Break!
Human Switchboard albums
Live new wave albums